Photon Kathaas was an Indian film production company led by director Gautham Vasudev Menon. It was established in 2010 by Menon along with Venky Somasundaram and Reshma Ghatala, who worked as the co-promoters. Its name is derived from Gautham Menon's original company Photon Factory, which had  previously co-produced several of Menon's films like Vettaiyaadu Vilaiyaadu and Kaakha Kaakha, its Telugu remake Gharshana and Pachaikili Muthucharam.

History
Photon Kathaas's first venture was Menon's psychological thriller Nadunisi Naaygal, Veppam, and Ram's second directorial Thanga Meengal, co-produced with RS Infotainment. Furthermore, an audio label named Photon Kathaas Music was launched as a division of the company, with newcomer Vijay Ebenezer's Kanden becoming their first release.

Soon after Photon Kathaas teamed up with RS Infotainment to produce Neethaane En Ponvasantham (2012), a romantic drama film featuring Jiiva and Samantha, but the film fared averagely at the box office. In February 2013, Elred Kumar of RS Infotainment filed a legal case against Gautham Menon and Madan claiming that he had entered into an agreement to do a film starring Silambarasan with music by A. R. Rahman in November 2008, during the making of Vinnaithaandi Varuvaayaa. He noted that they had agreed again in February 2010 to make the film, but now with Allu Arjun in the lead role. However, Elred claimed that both Gautham and Madan had gone on to do other projects even though they had been paid an advance of 40 million. As a result of the litigation, Menon had trouble releasing the rest of Photon Kathaas' productions.

Despite being announced as Photon Kathaas' productions at launch, Premsai's delayed bilingual films, Courier Boy Kalyan (2015) in Telugu and Tamilselvanum Thaniyar Anjalum (2016) in Tamil, were eventually released as films productions by Gautham Menon and his team without a banner. In an interview in November 2016, Gautham Menon revealed that Photon Kathaas had closed. He added there "was a vision, but we faltered because of the films that we did", and made reference to the cases filed by RS Infotainment against the studio.

Filmography

Production

Discography

Distribution

References 

Film production companies based in Chennai
Film distributors of India
Indian film studios
Indian companies established in 2010
Mass media companies established in 2010
2010 establishments in Tamil Nadu